Sabana de Nisibón is a small town in the Dominican Republic.

References 

Populated places in El Seibo Province